Sam Fernandes (born 7 April 1980) is an Indian film producer and distributor known for his works in Hindi cinema under Sparrow Films.

Early life and education
Sam Fernandes was born on 7 April 1980 in Mumbai, Maharashtra, in financial humble family. He dropped out of school in 5th grade and later pursued his career in marketing.

Sam has been associated with Bollywood and Boxing in India along with other initiatives.

Sam Fernandes is made the Head of the Indian chapter of the World Boxing Council in 2021. He also heads WBC Cares India Chapter which is the CSR wing of the council. The primary objective Of WBC Cares is to help the NGOs working towards various causes at grassroot levels.

Awards and recognition
Sam Fernandes won the 2018 Best Boxing Promoter award for Asia by World Boxing Council.

Filmography

References

External links 

1980 births
Living people
Film producers from Mumbai
Hindi film producers